Oxford Saints American Football Club is a British American football club that competes in the BAFANL (British American Football Association National League). Currently the team competes at senior level (adult mixed team for 18+) and operate a women's only team (17+)

The club is based in Abingdon and plays at Tilsley Park in Oxfordshire. Games are played at weekends from April through August.

Set up in 1983, Oxford Saints are one of the oldest American football teams in the UK. The women's team started in May 2016.

History

Early Years

Founded by Steve Abbott in 1983, the started as the Oxford Eagles but following a Radio Oxford phone-in competition the team was renamed Oxford Bulldogs.

As American football's popularity increased the first British league was formed, and in 1985 Bulldogs officially joined the AFL. Bulldogs finished their first season with an 8-1-1 record, being defeated by the London Ravens at the quarter final stage of the playoffs. Homes games were played at Cuttelsowe Park and the Whitehouse Ground (home of Oxford City FC).

In 1989, the Bulldogs were joined by local rivals Abingdon Pharaohs, strengthening the squad and broadening its fan base.

1992 - 1999

In 1992 the Oxford Bulldogs changed name to the Oxford Saints. Driven forward by general manager Roger Hedges, the club secured a major sponsorship deal and moved to a new home at the Oxford Stadium in Cowley.

Prior to the 1994 season, Coach Steve Conner returned to the US. Richard Emerick, another experienced US coach, was appointed as his replacement.

During 1995, the Saints made the playoffs and defeated the Invicta Eagles in the first round, along with victories over London Blitz and Colchester Gladiators. In the final, Oxford faced the Gwent Mustangs at Leicester's Saffron Lane Stadium and claimed a 14–6 victory and championship title.

In 1997 the Saints were on course for another appearance in the final round following a 9–1 season, but were defeated by the Nottingham Caesars in the semi final.

2000 - 2005

A 7-1 campaign in 2000 was followed by an impressive 8–0 season in 2001, both ending in semi final disappointment at the hands of the PA Knights and Ipswich Cardinals respectively. After a poor 2002 season Coach Janes moved upstairs as Director of Football and Phil DeMonte took over as head coach.

Coach DeMonte stayed at Saints for one season but the team made the playoffs, eventually beaten by the Gateshead Senators. The Saints raced through the newly formed BAFL division 2 in 2005 with a 9–1 record, ending the season with a loss to Kent Exiles.

2006–2009 
With the experienced Wayne Mayers at quarterback, the Saints powered through the 2006 season with a 9–1 record. The Saints came from behind to beat West Coast Trojans, 29–28, and clinched the Division 2 Title.

Promoted to BAFL Division 1 in 2007, the Saints finished 6–4 and 4-5-1 in 2008.

In 2009, Len Scott and former London Olympian Matt Coppinger boosted the offensive coaching staff with defensive back Nick Wykes returning as player-coach after a three-year hiatus. Former Saint and PA Knight Steve Belcher returned at wide receiver and kicker, providing the highlight of the season when he landed a record 57-yard field goal as time expired to defeat Birmingham Bulls in week 7.

Saints' hopes of a conference crown were dashed in the final game of the regular season by the Tamworth Phoenix. The season was concluded with a defeat by Cambridge Cats.

An 8–2 mark represented huge progress and also a swan song for head coach Chris Janes, who retired from active coaching and assumed the role of general manager.

2010 - 2013

Len Scott took over as head coach and reinforced the roster. The defense was bolstered with the addition of Dean Bryan, Adam Cartwright and Clive Russell, while the offense, with coordinator Matt Coppinger, featured rookie running back Kyle Micallef alongside brothers Jay and Chris Taylor, and a growing group of young British talent.

Competing again in the South West conference of Division 1, Saints had a strong start before running into the Premiership-bound Phoenix, and defeated all but the Tamworth-based outfit en route to a 7–3 record and a second straight playoff contest against Cambridge. The Saints were stopped short of reaching the semi-finals in a 13–7 defeat to the Cambridge Cats.

2010 and 2011 proved to be difficult years for the Saints due to various changes in the coaching staff and the departure of Head Coach Len Scott. During this time Chris Janes became the interim head coach before Andrew Day was officially appointed to the role.

2014–present 

In 2014, Chairman John Farley retired from his role and Martin Fitzpatrick took over, with a mostly new committee.

The Saints won their first four games before suffering back-to-back losses by the Shropshire Revolution and a loss by the Lincolnshire Bombers. The team finished the season with a 7–3 record, missing out on the playoffs due to losing a tie breaker condition between Oxford and Shropshire.

2015 saw further strong recruitment and a league realignment. With new quarterback Ben Denton, they ended the regular season with a 6–2 record and reached the quarter finals. A week before the quarter final game against Sussex Thunder, quarterback Ben Denton was diagnosed with leukemia. The Saints lost to the Thunder in the opening round.

During the offseason, chairman Martin Fitzpatrick stepped down from the role and vice-chairman Andrew Peart was voted in as his successor at the 2015 Annual General Meeting.

Peart coordinated the relocation of home games to Tilsley Park in Abingdon, with improved facilities for players and spectators. Peart has also laid the foundations for the Oxford Saints Women's team which began training in May 2016.

Notable additions to the 2016 roster include American nationals Destin Maulding (QB/WR), Bilal Redd (FS), Marlon Mason (CB and Eric Mendoza (LB). Further in the season, Tony Glover (RB) also joined the squad.

In August 2016, Ben Denton (QB) returned to the field for the first time after being diagnosed with leukemia in 2015.

In the 2016 playoffs, the Saints had home advantage and defeated the Cornish Sharks and Bristol Apache. The Saints progressed to the Division II Southern Final against the Cambridgeshire Cats and won 24–2, on 11 September at John Charles Stadium in Leeds.

At the end of the 2016 season, chairman Andrew Peart stood down and vice-chairman Graeme Taylor was elected to the leading role.

Oxford Saints Hall of Fame 
Oxford Saints constituted their Hall of Fame in 2008. 
Inductees:

Not Pictured:
Com - Pam Hedges
LB - Richard Davies
RB - Gary Walker
OL - STC David Creese
C - Nick Wykes
DL - Morris Coleman
LB - Andrew Day
GM - Chris Janes
OL - Paul Arnold
FB - Brian Myers
DL - Morris Coleman
LB/FB - Troy Smith
DE/FB - Chris Day
LB/TE - Paul Whitford
DE - Lee Hutton

Past record

External links
 Official website

BAFA National League teams
American football teams in England
1983 establishments in England
American football teams established in 1983